Nahal Kziv (lit. "Kziv stream") or the Horn Valley is a 39-kilometer long perennial stream in the Upper Galilee, Israel.  During the winter, rainfall fills the channel, and springs along the riverbed add to the flow. Currently, Mekorot (the Israeli national water company) pumps the water of the river's principal spring, Ein Ziv, and supplies it to the residents of the Western Galilee, making the channel between Ein Ziv and Ein Tamir an intermittent stream. On the southern ridge overlooking the valley sits a 12th-century Crusader castle, Montfort, the old headquarters of the Teutonic Order in the Holy Land.

Geography

The Horn Valley flows from the western side of Mount Meron near Beit Jann, westward to its estuary, north of and Achziv. It is the longest stream in the Galilee, with the widest drainage basin. The channel passes nearby Hurfeish, Abirim, Mi'ilya, Mitzpe Hila, Neve Ziv, Goren, Manot, and Ma'alot-Tarshiha. Springs along the channel include:
 Ein Ziv
 Ein Tamir (after which the stream becomes perennial).
 Ein Hardalit
 Ein Yakim

Nature reserve
Most of the stream is part of a nature reserve that bears its name, and includes the Montfort Castle and other Crusader-period ruins. A stone carving of a man, 1.78 m high can be found near where the Abirim stream empties into the Horn Valley. The carving is thought to date from the Hellenistic period.

Flora in the area includes Lilium candidum, Rubus sanguineus, Nerium oleander, Platanus orientalis, Artemisia arborescens, and Ferns. Persian fallow deer were brought to the area in 1996, as part of an effort to prevent extinction of the species. Other wildlife belonging to the nature reserve include golden jackals, wolves, wild boar, and the rare striped hyena.

References

External links
 Hikes in Nahal Kziv

Rivers of Israel
Nature reserves in Israel
Protected areas of Northern District (Israel)